In computational complexity theory, the compression theorem is an important theorem about the complexity of computable functions. 

The theorem states that there exists no largest complexity class, with computable boundary, which contains all computable functions.

Compression theorem
Given a Gödel numbering  of the computable functions and a Blum complexity measure  where a complexity class for a boundary function  is defined as

Then there exists a total computable function  so that for all 

and

References
.
.

Computational complexity theory
Structural complexity theory
Theorems in the foundations of mathematics